Hugh Morgan may refer to:

 Hugh Morgan (apothecary) (c. 1530–1613), Queen Elizabeth's apothecary
 Huey Morgan (born 1968), frontman of the New York-based rock/hip hop group Fun Lovin' Criminals
 Hugh Morgan (businessman) (born 1940), Australian former Western Mining Corporation CEO
 Hugh Morgan (footballer, born 1869) (1869–1930), Scottish international football inside forward who played for Liverpool and Blackburn Rovers
 Hugh Morgan (footballer, born 1875), Scottish-born football outside forward whose clubs included Sunderland and Bolton Wanderers
 Hugh Jackson Morgan (1893–1961), professor